Akoya is a genus of sea snails, marine gastropod mollusks, in the family Calliostomatidae within the superfamily Trochoidea, the top snails, turban snails and their allies.

Species
Species within the genus Akoya (gastropod) include:
 Akoya akoya (Kuroda, 1942)

The following species were brought into synonymy:
 Akoya shinayaka Habe, 1961

References

Calliostomatidae
Monotypic gastropod genera